Birgir Ísleifur Gunnarsson (19 July 1936 – 28 October 2019) was an Icelandic politician and lawyer. He was the governor of the Central Bank of Iceland from 1991 to 2005.

Birgir was the mayor of Reykjavík from 1972 to 1978, member of parliament from 1979 to 1991 for the Independence Party, and served as the minister of education from 1987 to 1988. From 1965 to 1991 he was a board member of the National Power Company of Iceland.

References 

1936 births
2019 deaths
Mayors of Reykjavík
Governors of the Central Bank of Iceland
Birgir Ísleifur Gunnarsson
Birgir Ísleifur Gunnarsson